Guillermo Pérez Roldán was the defending champion.

Pérez-Roldán successfully defended his title, defeating Younes El Aynaoui 6–4, 6–3 in the final.

Seeds

  Jordi Arrese (first round)
  Franco Davín (quarterfinals)
  Guillermo Pérez Roldán (champion)
  Magnus Gustafsson (second round)
  Goran Prpić (first round)
  Bart Wuyts (quarterfinals)
  Horst Skoff (semifinals)
  Àlex Corretja (first round)

Draw

Finals

Top half

Bottom half

References

External links
 ATP – 1993 Grand Prix Hassan II Singles draw

Singles